Paul Tomlinson (born 4 February 1965) is an English former footballer who played as a goalkeeper for Sheffield United, Birmingham City (on loan) and Bradford City.

Bradford City signed Tomlinson for a club record £47,500 from Sheffield United in June 1987, replacing Peter Litchfield in goal for the 1987–88 season. He holds the record for number of games played by a Bradford City goalkeeper with 293 appearances, previously held by Jock Ewart for 67 years.

References

External links
 

1965 births
Living people
Footballers from Rotherham
English footballers
Association football goalkeepers
Sheffield United F.C. players
Birmingham City F.C. players
Bradford City A.F.C. players
English Football League players